Labadieville is a census-designated place (CDP) in Assumption Parish, Louisiana, United States. The population was 1,854 at the 2010 census. It is part of the Pierre Part Micropolitan Statistical Area.

History
Labadieville, originally called "Brûlée Labadie", takes its name from a French pioneer and resident, Jean Louis L'Abadie. In 1721, there were some fifty warriors of the Chitimacha tribe. During the two decades after 1750, the area around Labadieville was taken up by French and Spanish, joined by Acadians, Isleños and a sprinkling of Germans from the Cote des Allemands or German Coast to the east on the Mississippi River.

In 1843, a mission was established. St. Philomena Catholic Church dates from 1848 as an organized parish, and the first mass was said in the home of Widow Zacharie Boudreaux. The first building was occupied in 1847.

During the Civil War, Labadieville was the scene of the Battle of Georgia Landing, Oct. 27, 1862, between Union forces under Gen. Weitzel and a body of Confederate troops under Brig. Gen. Alfred Mouton. Major General Benjamin F. Butler, commanding Union forces in the Department of the Gulf, launched an expedition into the Bayou Lafourche region to eliminate the Rebel threat from that area, to make sure that sugar and cotton products from there would come into Union hands and, in the future, to use it as a base for other military operations. Reaching Donaldsonville the next day, the troops were disembarked. On the 26th, they marched down the Bayou Lafourche  to Napoleonville, but were unable to find the Confederate force known to be in that region. On the 27th Gen. Weitzel continued his march to Labadieville, on the east bank of the bayou, where he found the enemy in considerable force entrenched on both sides of the bayou, with six pieces of artillery in battery. Confederate forces included the 18th Louisiana Infantry Regiment, Crescent Regiment, Ralston's Battery, Detachment of Cavalry, 33rd Louisiana Infantry Regiment, Terre Bonne Regiment of the Louisiana Militia, Semmes's Battery and 2nd Louisiana Cavalry Regiment (approx. 1,392 men).

Gen. Weitzel's troops began skirmishing with Confederate positions on the east bank at about 11:00 a.m. Lacking the artillery support of the troops entrenched on the west bank of the bayou, Confederate troops in these positions retired quickly. By means of a floating bridge Gen. Weitzel began crossing his men to the west bank to attack the Rebel troops there. For some time, these Confederate troops fought resolutely and brought the Union assault to a standstill. However, a lack of artillery ammunition compelled the Confederate forces to abandon these positions as well. Confederate forces retreated up the bayou to Labadieville.

Union losses were 18 killed and 68 wounded. Confederate losses were estimated at 229. Additionally, 206 Confederates were taken prisoner. On the 28th Weitzel entered and occupied Thibodaux, a few miles below Labadieville, and on the 29th communication was opened with New Orleans by means of the New Orleans, Opelousas and Great Western Railroad. The result of the expedition was to open the whole region of the Bayou Lafourche to Union occupation.

In 1905, a canal, called the Cancienne, leading east from Lake Verret to Bayou Lafourche near Napoleonville, was constructed.

Geography
Labadieville is located at  (29.832537, -90.954692).

Demographics

As of the census of 2000, there were 1,811 people, 666 households, and 514 families residing in the CDP. The racial makeup of the CDP was 81.12% White, 17.50% African American, 0.28% Native American, 0.17% Asian, 0.17% from other races, and 0.77% from two or more races. Hispanic or Latino of any race were 1.10% of the population.

There were 666 households, out of which 36.9% had children under the age of 18 living with them, 61.7% were married couples living together, 13.1% had a female householder with no husband present, and 22.7% were non-families. 18.8% of all households were made up of individuals, and 9.0% had someone living alone who was 65 years of age or older. The average household size was 2.72 and the average family size was 3.12.

In the CDP, the population was spread out, with 26.5% under the age of 18, 10.3% from 18 to 24, 29.3% from 25 to 44, 22.6% from 45 to 64, and 11.2% who were 65 years of age or older. The median age was 35 years. For every 100 females, there were 92.9 males. For every 100 females age 18 and over, there were 89.9 males.

The median income for a household in the CDP was $35,417, and the median income for a family was $43,438. Males had a median income of $34,904 versus $22,063 for females. The per capita income for the CDP was $14,865. About 12.4% of families and 17.5% of the population were below the poverty line, including 26.4% of those under age 18 and 24.9% of those age 65 or over.

Notable person

Self-taught folk artist Mary Anne de Boisblanc was born in Labadieville in 1925.

See also 
 Congregation of the Immaculate Conception

References

Populated places established in 1721
Census-designated places in Assumption Parish, Louisiana
Census-designated places in Louisiana
Louisiana Isleño communities
1721 establishments in the French colonial empire